Emilio Monzó (born 26 September 1965) is an Argentine lawyer and politician who served as President of the Argentine Chamber of Deputies from 2015 to 2019. In 2015, he founded the Dialogue Party, which is affiliated with Republican Proposal (PRO) and forms part of the Juntos por el Cambio coalition.

He was born in Carlos Tejedor, Buenos Aires Province and studied law at the University of Buenos Aires.

He began his political activism in the 1980s in the Union of the Democratic Center, later switching to the Justicialist Party. In 2011 he joined Republican Proposal and worked at the successful 2015 presidential campaign of Mauricio Macri.

He was intendente (mayor) of his birthplace between 2003 and 2007 after serving in the City Council. He served as Minister of Rural Affairs in the provincial government of Daniel Scioli, and later became Mauricio Macri's Chief of Staff of in the Buenos Aires City government.

References

|-

|-

1965 births
Living people
People from Buenos Aires Province
Members of the Buenos Aires Province Chamber of Deputies
Members of the Argentine Chamber of Deputies elected in Buenos Aires Province
Presidents of the Argentine Chamber of Deputies
Union of the Democratic Centre (Argentina) politicians
Justicialist Party politicians
Republican Proposal politicians
Mayors of places in Argentina
University of Buenos Aires alumni